Mynardus Jeremias "Tiger" Devenish (27 May 1867 – 10 September 1928) was a South African international rugby union player.

Biography
Born in Victoria West, he attended SACS before playing provincial rugby for Transvaal (now known as the Golden Lions). In July 1891 he was selected to represent South Africa, as a forward, in their first ever Test—against Great Britain at the Crusader's Ground, Port Elizabeth. The match, which was won by Great Britain, was his only appearance for South Africa. Devenish died in 1928 at the age of 61.

Test history

See also
List of South Africa national rugby union players – Springbok no. 10

References

1867 births
1928 deaths
People from Victoria West
South African rugby union players
South Africa international rugby union players
Rugby union players from the Northern Cape
Rugby union forwards
Golden Lions players